The High Crusade is a 1983 board game published by TSR in Ares magazine #16.

Gameplay
The High Crusade is a game based on Poul Anderson's novel The High Crusade, and recreates the struggle of the rebel Crusaders in their mission to overthrow the evil Wersgorix empire.

Reception
Rick Swan reviewed The High Crusade in Space Gamer No. 71. Swan commented that "With the demise of Ares, it'd be a shame if a great game like The High Crusade got lost in the shuffle.  There are apparently no plans to reissue Ares games in boxed versions, so you'll have to round up a copy of issue 16 to get the game.  It's worth the effort.  The High Crusade is an absolute treat."

References

Board games introduced in 1983
TSR, Inc. games